Six ships of the Royal Navy have borne the name HMS Banterer:

 was a 22-gun sixth rate launched in 1807 and wrecked in 1808.
 was a 14-gun  launched in 1810 and sold in 1817 for breaking up.
 was a 16-gun sloop launched in 1810 and sold in 1817.
 was an  wooden screw gunboat launched in 1855 and sold in 1872.
 was a  composite screw gunboat launched in 1880 and sold in 1907.
She was renamed HMS Banterer in 1915 and was sold in 1928.

References

Royal Navy ship names